{{Speciesbox
| name = Sturt's desert pea
| image = Sturts desert pea.jpg
| image_caption = Sturt's desert pea, at Melbourne Zoo
| genus = Swainsona
| species = formosa
| authority = (G. Don) Joy Thomps.
| synonyms =
 Clianthus dampieri <small>Lindl.</small>
 Clianthus formosus (G.Don) Ford & Vickery
 Clianthus oxleyi A.Cunn. ex Lindl.
 Clianthus speciosus (G.Don) Asch. & Graebn.
 Colutea novae-hollandiae Walp.
 Donia formosa G.Don
 Donia speciosa G.Don
 Willdampia formosa (G.Don) A.S.George
| synonyms_ref = 
}}Swainsona formosa, Sturt's desert pea, is an Australian plant in the genus Swainsona, named after English botanist Isaac Swainson, famous for its distinctive blood-red leaf-like flowers, each with a bulbous black centre, or "boss". It is one of Australia's best known wildflowers. It is native to the arid regions of central and north-western Australia, and its range extends into all mainland Australian states with the exception of Victoria.

 Description 

Sturt's desert pea is a member of Fabaceae, subfamily Faboideae. It has pinnate, grey-green leaves which are arranged spirally on the main axis of the plant, and in two opposite rows (distichous) on lateral stems.

 Flower 
Its flowers are so different from its relatives that it is almost unrecognisable as a member of the pea family.  The flowers are about 9 centimetres in length and grow in clusters of around half a dozen on thick vertical stalks (peduncles), which spring up every 10-15 centimetres along the prostrate stems in a bright red, which may be up to 2 metres in length. The sexual organs, enclosed by the keel, comprise 10 stamens, of which 9 are joined and 1 is free, and an ovary topped by a style upon which is located the stigma which receives pollen during fertilisation.

The plant flowers from spring to summer, particularly after rain. There is a natural pure white form, as well as varieties which can have flowers ranging from blood scarlet, to pink and even pale cream, with central bosses of white, pink, light red, dark red and purple. Several tricolour variants have been recorded, including the cultivars marginata (white keel with red margin, red flag and purple-black boss), tricolour (white keel, red flag, pink boss), and elegans (white flag and keel, both with red margins). Flowers are bird-pollinated in the wild.

 Fruit 
The fruit is a legume, about 5 centimetres long, and each yields 50 or more flat, kidney-shaped seeds at maturity.

 Taxonomy and naming 
Specimens of Sturt's desert pea were first collected by William Dampier who recorded his first sighting on 22 August 1699 on Rosemary Island. These specimens are today in the Fielding-Druce Herbarium at the University of Oxford in England.

The taxonomy of Sturt's desert pea has been changed on a number of occasions. It was initially treated in the 18th century in the genus Clianthus as Clianthus dampieri, and later became more widely known as Clianthus formosus (formosus is Latin for "beautiful"). However it was later reclassified by Joy Thompson under the genus Swainsona as Swainsona formosa, the name by which it is officially known today.

A further reclassification to Willdampia formosa was proposed in the publication Western Australian Naturalist in 1999; however this proposal was rejected by the scientific community in 2000.

The common name honours Charles Sturt, who recorded seeing large quantities of the flowers while exploring central Australia in 1844; the second version of the scientific name honours the naturalist Isaac Swainson, and the third (rejected) version of the scientific name was intended to honour the explorer William Dampier.

Most forms of the plant are low-growing or prostrate, however in the Pilbara region of north-western Australia varieties growing as tall as 2 metres have been observed.

Common names
The first recorded uses of common names for Swainsona formosa (Author/publication and year of first use).:

showy donia (G. Don, 1832)
beautiful donia (G. Don, 1832)
Dampier's clianth (Veitch, 1850)
Dampier's clianthus (Hooker, 1858)
Sturt's pea (Adelaide Advertiser, 1858)
Sturt pea (de Mole, 1861)
Captain Sturt's desert pea (Aspinall, 1862)
desert pea (Anon., 1864)
Sturt's desert pea (Tenison-Woods, 1865)
glory flower (Bailey, 1883)
glory pea (Bailey, 1883)
Sturt's glory pea (Anon., 1886)
lobster claws (The Garden, 1890)
blood flower (Parker, 1898)
Dampier's glory pea (Guilfoyle, 1911)
Australian glory pea (Guilfoyle, 1911)
Dampier pea (Harris, 1980)

It is well adapted to life as a desert plant. The small seeds have a long viability, and can germinate after many years. Seeds have a hard seed coat, which protects them from harsh arid environments until the next rainfall, but inhibits germination in normal domestic environments. Growers can overcome this dormancy either by nicking the seed coat away from the 'eye' of the seed, by rubbing the seed gently between pieces of sandpaper, or by placing the seed in hot (just off-boiling) water and leaving it to soak overnight.

Once germinated, seedlings quickly establish a deep taproot, vital for desert survival. This means that if domestically grown, they should either be planted in their intended final location, transplanted as soon as possible after germination, or grafted as a seedling on to a different root such as the bladder senna, Colutea arborescens. They do not tolerate disturbance of their roots but, once established in well-drained soil, require little and infrequent watering, and can withstand extreme heat and sunshine, as well as light frosts.

Sturt's desert pea is not endangered, but it is illegal to collect specimens of the plant from Crown land without a permit. The plants must not be collected from private land without the written consent of the land owner.

Use as emblem and icon

Sturt's desert pea (described as Clianthus formosus'') was adopted as the floral emblem of the state of South Australia on 23 November 1961. Its iconic status in Australia, and particularly in South Australia, has ensured its use as a popular subject in artwork and photography, as well as a decorative motif, and in a range of commercial uses (such as the previous logo of BankSA). It appears in the logo of the National Parks and Wildlife Service, South Australia, as well as in its associated volunteer umbrella organisation, Friends of Parks. Sturt's Desert Pea has also made many appearances in prose and verse, as well as featuring in some aboriginal legends.

Sturt's desert pea has appeared in several releases of Australian postage stamps depicting Australian floral emblems (issued in 1968, 1971 and 2005). The flower also features on the logo of Charles Sturt University, which is also named after the explorer.

References

External links 

South Australian Government Floral Emblem (official website)
Australian emblems - South Australia (Australian National Botanic Gardens website)
Aboriginal myth about the Sturt's Desert Pea
Info Page from the Association of Societies for Growing Australian Plants (hosted by Charles Sturt University, New South Wales.
Large image of Sturt's Desert Pea
Sturt's Desert Pea Fact-sheet from Gardening Australia, a TV programme of the Australian Broadcasting Corporation.
Oxford University Herbaria
Sturt's Desert Pea costume (designed for the South Australian Centenary in 1936 by Thelma Thomas Afford, of Adelaide).

formosa
Fabales of Australia
Rosids of Western Australia
Flora of South Australia
Flora of the Northern Territory
Flora of Queensland
Flora of New South Wales
Emblems of South Australia
Charles Sturt